Adalberto López (4 July 1923 – 15 December 1996) was a Mexican professional footballer who most played as a striker. Lopez scored a total of 201 goals in 231 matches in Liga MX.

Career
Born in Cocula, Jalisco, "El Dumbo" López played club football for Club Atlas, Club León, Club Oro and Chivas de Guadalajara, scoring a record 196 Mexican Primera División goals.

He was elected to the Mexican American Hall of Fame in 1988.

He died in Los Angeles in December 1996.

References

Mexican footballers
1923 births
1996 deaths
Club León footballers
C.D. Guadalajara footballers
Liga MX players
Association football forwards
Mexican emigrants to the United States